Seth Stewart is an American actor, singer and dancer known for his roles in the musicals Hamilton (2015) and In the Heights (2008, cameo in 2021 film adaptation). Other film appearances include Music and Lyrics (2007), Britney: For the Record (2008) and Friends with Benefits (2011).

Early life 
Stewart is from Kent, Ohio. As a boy, Stewart played football and wrestled, but always wanted to act. He studied dance starting at age 10 at the James Dance and Performing Arts Center in Howland, and then with Inna Stabrova and Dmitri Tuboltsev at the Ohio Youth Ballet as a teen. He graduated from Theodore Roosevelt High School in 2002 and started the Fordham University/Alvin Ailey School BFA program, leaving prior to graduating. He attended The Ailey School of the Alvin Ailey American Dance Theater for a year and a half.

Career

Sweet Charity: 2005 Broadway revival

In the Heights: 2008 Broadway 
Stewart originated the role of "Graffiti Pete" in the musical In the Heights. 
He appeared in the original production, which premiered Off-Broadway at 37 Arts in January 2007 in previews. The New York Times reviewer wrote of his performance: "A particular standout is Seth Stewart, playing a sweet-hearted graffiti artist, who seems to have little springboards in his sneakers." He appeared in the original Broadway production 
from February 14, 2008, to August 25, 2009, and then returned for a four-week engagement from June 7, 2010, to July 3, 2010.

Hamilton 
In the musical, Stewart was part of the ensemble cast and was as an understudy to Daveed Diggs for the roles of Marquis de Lafayette and Thomas Jefferson. In September 2016, he assumed both roles on a permanent basis. He left the production in April 2017, when he was replaced by James Monroe Iglehart.

Theater credits

Filmography

Other works 
In addition to theater and appearances in movies, Stewart has been on tour with Jennifer Lopez and Madonna.
In addition to that, Stewart has starred in Paula DeAnda's music video "Walk Away (Remember Me)" as DeAnda's ex-boyfriend as well as Jay Z.

References

External links 

American male actors
Living people
People from Kent, Ohio
Year of birth missing (living people)